Live in the City of Angels is the seventh (double) live album by Scottish rock band Simple Minds, released in early October 2019 to document their largest ever North American tour.

Overview
On 20 August 2019, Simple Minds announced the release on 4 October 2019 of Live in the City of Angels, their new live album capturing the band on their biggest ever (31-show) North American tour (24 September–11 November 2018), mostly recorded on 24 October 2018 at the Orpheum Theatre, Los Angeles, California (i.e. the City of Angels). Twenty-four of the tracks were performed that night in Los Angeles, with only "Glittering Prize" being recorded on 8 November 2018 at the Fillmore-Gleason Theatre in Miami Beach. The bonus tracks available on the Deluxe CD and digital formats were recorded at various sound checks and rehearsals. The 40-song collection spans the band's 40-year career.

The album title can be seen as a reference (and a nod) to their first (1987) live album, Live in the City of Light, which was mostly recorded in Paris, France (i.e. the City of Light).

Release
Live in the City of Angels was released on 4 October 2019 and made available on multiple formats: standard double CD, deluxe 4-CD album (4 CDs in a hardback book), 4-vinyl quadpack, digital downloads, and streaming services (plus a signed set list bundle). The standard CD and vinyl format features 25 songs while the Deluxe CD and digital formats feature 40 songs. Though the standard edition contains the whole concert in order (with Glittering Prize added in), it fades the audience out and back in between each song.

Track listing

Standard CD and vinyl edition

Deluxe CD and digital bonus tracks

 "Let the Day Begin" is a cover of The Call's 1989 song, which Simple Minds first covered on  Searching for the Lost Boys (2009) and then again on Big Music (2014).

Charts

References

2019 live albums
Simple Minds live albums